Acacia nyssophylla, commonly known as pin bush, wait a while and spine bush, is a shrub of the genus Acacia and the subgenus Plurinerves that is endemic to a large area of central and south-western and southern Australia.

Description
Like most species of Acacia it has phyllodes rather than true leaves. The evergreen phyllodes are fixed on yellow stem-projections. The firmly chartaceous seed pods that form after flowering have a linear shape that are a little constricted between each of the seeds and are curved to once-coiled.

Taxonomy
It was first described by Ferdinand von Mueller in 1863 from a specimen collected by Babbage near Lake Gairdner in South Australia. The specific epithet is taken from the Greek words nysso meaning to pierce and phyllon meaning leaf in reference to the stiff and pointy phyllodes.

Distribution
It is native to an area in the Wheatbelt and Goldfields-Esperance regions of Western Australia, through South Australia to extreme north-western Victoria, and north from South Australia to near Alice Springs in the Northern Territory, to Western New South Wales near Bourke.

See also
List of Acacia species

References

nyssophylla
Acacias of Western Australia
Flora of the Northern Territory
Flora of New South Wales
Flora of South Australia
Flora of Victoria (Australia)
Taxa named by Ferdinand von Mueller